Sendul (also Romanized as Sendūl) is a village in Mashiz Rural District, in the Central District of Bardsir County, Kerman Province, Iran. At the 2006 census, its population was 69, in 14 families.

References 

Populated places in Bardsir County